Willoughby is an electoral district of the Legislative Assembly in the Australian state of New South Wales. It was previously represented by Gladys Berejiklian of the Liberal Party, who announced on 1 October 2021 that she would resign from the Legislative Assembly and as Premier of New South Wales. She was replaced at the 2022 Willoughby state by-election on 12 February 2022 by Liberal Tim James.

History
Willoughby was an electoral district of the New South Wales Legislative Assembly, first created in 1894 with the abolition of multi-member electoral districts from part of St Leonards, and named after and including the Sydney suburb of Willoughby. It was abolished in 1904 and re-established in 1913. In 1920 with the introduction of proportional representation, it was absorbed into the multi-member electorate of Ryde along with Burwood and Gordon.  It was recreated in 1927 with the return to single-member electorates. It was abolished in 1988, with most of its territory becoming Middle Harbour.  In 1991, Middle Harbour was abolished and replaced by a recreated Willoughby.

Like most seats in the North Shore, Willoughby is a stronghold for the Liberal Party. Counting its time as Middle Harbour, the Liberals or their predecessors have held the seat for all but two terms since the return to single-member seats in 1927. The one break in this tradition came in the "Wranslide" of 1978, when a split in the Liberal vote allowed 's Eddie Britt to sweep into office. However, a redistribution ahead of the 1981 election erased Britt's majority and made Willoughby notionally Liberal. Britt narrowly lost to future state opposition leader Peter Collins even in the face of the second "Wranslide."

The seat reverted to form in 1984, with Collins easily seeing off Britt in a rematch. Since then, Labor has usually run dead in Willoughby, and on some occasions has been pushed into third place. The only time the Liberal hold on the seat has been seriously threatened since the 1980s came on Collins' retirement in 2003. Pat Reilly, the longtime mayor of the City of Willoughby, ran as an independent and nearly defeated Liberal Gladys Berejiklian on Labor preferences. The swing against the Liberals was large enough to drop the Liberal margin over Labor to 7.2 percent, the closest in two decades. However, Berejiklian easily dispatched Reilly in a rematch and has held the seat without serious difficulty ever since.

Willoughby is one of four electorates in the New South Wales Legislative Assembly to have been held by two Premiers of New South Wales while in office. Both Premiers (Sir) Charles Wade and Gladys Berejiklian held Willoughby while in office, the other three electorates being Ku-ring-gai, Maroubra and Wollondilly.

Berejiklian has facts in common with her predecessor in Willoughby, Collins in that both had served as state Liberal leaders and prior to that served as Deputy Liberal leader and Treasurer although unlike Collins, Berejiklian held the positions of Deputy Liberal leader and Treasurer simultaneously.

Members for Willoughby

Election results

References

External links 

Willoughby
1894 establishments in Australia
Willoughby
1904 disestablishments in Australia
Willoughby
1913 establishments in Australia
Willoughby
1920 disestablishments in Australia
Willoughby
1927 establishments in Australia
Willoughby
1988 disestablishments in Australia
Willoughby
1991 establishments in Australia
Willoughby